Brognaturo is a comune (municipality) in the Province of Vibo Valentia in the Italian region Calabria, located about  southwest of Catanzaro and about  southeast of Vibo Valentia.

Brognaturo borders the following municipalities: Badolato, Cardinale, Guardavalle, San Sostene, Santa Caterina dello Ionio, Simbario, Spadola, Stilo.

References

External links
 Official website
 Brognaturo Civil records database of Birth,death,marriage records 1809-1910
 Brognaturo Online

Cities and towns in Calabria